Csonka is a Hungarian surname.  Notable people with the surname include:

Árpád Csonka (born 1991), Slovak football striker
Ferenc Csonka (fl. 1950s), Hungarian sprint canoer
János Csonka (1852–1939), Hungarian engineer
Larry Csonka (born 1946), American football (NFL) fullback
Paul Csonka (1905–1995), Austrian composer and opera conductor
Zsófia Csonka (born 1983), Hungarian sport-shooter

See also
Csonka (disambiguation)

Hungarian-language surnames